"(Do You Love Me) Just Say Yes" is a song written by Bob DiPiero, John Scott Sherrill and Dennis Robbins, and recorded by American country music group Highway 101.  It was released in June 1988 as the first single from the album 101².  The song was Highway 101's third number one on the country chart. The song spent one week at that position and twenty weeks on the chart. It also reached Number One on the RPM Country Tracks charts in Canada.

Charts

Weekly charts

Year-end charts

References

1988 singles
Highway 101 songs
Songs written by Bob DiPiero
Songs written by John Scott Sherrill
Song recordings produced by Paul Worley
Songs written by Dennis Robbins
Warner Records singles
1988 songs